Su Friedrich (born December 12, 1954) is an American avant-garde film director, producer, writer, and cinematographer.

Early life 
Su Friedrich was born in 1954 in New Haven, Connecticut. Her mother was German and came to the US with Friedrich's father, Paul Friedrich who was working in Germany as a GI at the time. Friedrich attended the University of Chicago (1971–72) and Oberlin College (1972–1975) from which she earned a B.A. in Art and Art History. She lives and works in Brooklyn, NY, and is a Professor in the Center for the Creative and Performing Arts at Princeton University, where she has taught film and video production since 1998. She made her first film, Hot Water, in 1978, and has produced and directed eighteen films and videos.

Career 
Friedrich's films regularly combine elements of narrative, documentary, and experimental styles of film-making and often focus on the roles of women, family, and homosexuality in contemporary America. From the onset of her career in the late 1970s, Friedrich has been a leading figure in avant-garde filmmaking and a pivotal force in the establishment of Queer Cinema. Her work has radicalized film form and content by incorporating a feminist perspective and issues of lesbian identity and by creating a remarkable and innovative synthesis of experimental, narrative and documentary genres. Friedrich's films are multi-lingual, moving between the personal and the political, from autobiographical films about family to the investigation of society's notions of sexual identity. Her cinematic palette includes home movies, archival footage, interviews, and scripted narratives.

Friedrich is the recipient of the Cal Arts Alpert Award in the Arts and has received fellowships from the Rockefeller Foundation and John Simon Guggenheim Memorial Foundation, as well as numerous grants from the New York State Council on the Arts, the New York Foundation for the Arts, Independent Television Service, and the Jerome Foundation. Her films and videos are screened in the US, Canada, and Europe, and have been the subject of retrospectives at the Whitney Museum of American Art, the Rotterdam International Film Festival, The Stadtkino in Vienna, the Pacific Cinematheque in Vancouver, the National Film Theater in London, and many others. Friedrich's work is part of the collection at the Museum of Modern Art, the Art Institute of Chicago, the Royal Film Archive of Belgium, the Centre Pompidou in Paris, and the National Library of Australia. Her complete original film materials are being conserved at the Academy of Motion Picture Arts and Sciences Film Archive in Los Angeles.

Friedrich's films have won many awards, including: for The Odds of Recovery, Best Documentary at Identities Festival in Vienna; for Hide and Seek, Best Narrative Film Award at the Athens International Film Festival, Outstanding Documentary Feature at Outfest '97 in Los Angeles, Special Jury Award at the New York Gay & Lesbian Film Festival and Juror's Choice Award at the Charlotte Film Festival; for Sink or Swim, Grand Prix at the Melbourne Film Festival, the Golden Gate Award at the San Francisco International Film Festival, Gold Juror's Choice Award at the Charlotte Film and Video Festival, Special Jury Award at the Atlanta Film Festival and Best Experimental Film Award at the USA Short Film and Video Festival; for Damned If You Don't, Best Experimental Film Award at the Athens Film Festival and Best Experimental Narrative Award at the Atlanta Film Festival; and for Cool Hands, Warm Heart, Special Merit Award at the Athens Film Festival. Friedrich also won the Peter S. Reed Lifetime Achievement Award in 2000.

The films have been reviewed in numerous publications, including Variety, Premiere, The Village Voice, Artforum, The New York Times, The Nation, Film Quarterly, The Millennium Film Journal, Film Comment, Sight and Sound, Flash Art, Cineaste, The Independent, Heresies Art Journal, Afterimage, and The L.A. Weekly. Essays on her work as well as excerpts from her scripts have appeared in numerous books, including Women's Experimental Cinema (2007), 501 Movie Directors (2007), Contemporary American Independent Film: From the Margins to the Mainstream (2005), Visionary Film: The American Avant-Garde, 1943–2000 (2002), Left In the Dark (2002), The Wedding Complex: Forms of Belonging in Modern American Culture (2002), Girl Director: A How-To Guide (2001), Collecting Visible Evidence (1999), Experimental Ethnography (1999), The New American Cinema (1998), Play It Again, Sam (1998), Film Fatales (1998), Cinematernity (1996), Screen Writings (1994), Women's Films (1994), Queer Looks (1993), Avant-Garde Film: Motion Studies (1993), Vampires and Violets (1992), and Critical Cinema: Volume Two (1992).

The moving image collection of Su Friedrich is held at the Academy Film Archive. The archive preserved Cool Hands, Warm Heart in 2019.

Filmography

Gently Down the Stream 
The short film consists of texts and rephotographed imagery, which both represents Friedrich's fourteen dreams that are taken from eight years of her journals. Imagery of the Virgin Mary and Christ, a woman rowing a machine in gym, another woman swimming in pool, and body of water are presented with a hand-scratched word at a time, and pulled audience in Friedrich's flow of consciousness in the process to reconstruct and analyze her dream.

The Ties That Bind 
The Ties That Bind is a documentary of Friedrich's mother, who was born in Ulm in Germany and grew up with the Third Reich. The film centered narrative by mother about her personal history in Germany, rise of Nazism, life during the war, and the day when the war was over, in form of an interview by a daughter/director. Mother's voice is illustrated by various imagery, including Friedrich's travel to Germany, scene of anti-nuclear demo in New York, as well as the mother's personal moving images. As the title of The Ties That Bind suggests, this film depicts the ties that lie between the past and present, between mother and daughter.

Damned If You Don’t 
Damned If You Don’t is the film about Catholicism and lesbianism, particularly the sexuality of nuns. The narrative in the film has three layers in its structure; a young woman seducing a young nun; adaptation of Powell and Pressburger's film, Black Narcissus (1947) that is about a nun in the convent in Himalayas; reading of Judith C. Brown's Immodest Acts: The Life of a Lesbian Nun in Renaissance Italy. By exploiting the layered narratives, Damned If You Don’t reveals a common assumption in melodrama that all desire is heterosexual, and shows a new direction of depiction of female desire, pleasure and sexuality.

Sink or Swim 
Through a series of twenty six short stories, Sink or Swim describes the childhood events that shaped a girl's ideas about fatherhood, family relations, work and play. As the stories unfold, a dual portrait emerges: that of a father who cared more for his career than for his family, and of a daughter who was deeply affected by his behavior. Working in counterpoint to the forceful text are sensual black and white images that depict both the extraordinary and ordinary events of daily life.

In 2015, the United States Library of Congress selected Sink or Swim for preservation in the National Film Registry, finding it "culturally, historically, or aesthetically significant".

Hide and Seek 
Hide and Seek is an exploration into lesbian adolescence in the 1960s. Lou is a 12-year-old girl who daydreams in a tree house, tries not to watch a sex education film, wins a rock throwing contest, and is horrified to discover that her best friend is taking an interest in earrings and boys. Interwoven with Lou's story are the mostly hilarious, sometimes painful recollections of adult lesbians who try to figure out how they ever got from there to here. Completing the picture are clips from a wide array of old scientific and educational films blended with the black and white images of Lou's world.

From the Ground Up 
Friedrich's work has always used personal narrative to support strong political beliefs. With her recent movie From the Ground Up she follows the coffee road from bean to purchased brew, in a quest to "understand how the cup of coffee [she'd] just gotten at the pushcart could cost only fifty cents." Beginning with the farmers in the Guatemalan countryside, we follow the bean from the exporter in Guatemala City, to the importer in Charleston, SC, then on to the roaster in Queens before it ends up in the Manhattan pushcart. Rather than make a traditional social documentary, Friedrich made a film that echoed her own experience, "which was that of being stunned by the unimaginable scale and complexity of the coffee industry and the often grueling physical labor required to get those seedling to eventually yield a cup of coffee." During the making of the film Friedrich became a supporter of the fair trade coffee movement, and dedicated the film to the movement and the people involved.

Gut Renovation 
Documentary about the gentrification of Williamsburg, Brooklyn and the displacement of long-term businesses and residents.

See also 
 List of female film and television directors
 List of lesbian filmmakers
 List of LGBT-related films directed by women
 Women's cinema

References

Further reading

External links 
 
 
  Su Friedrich at Senses of Cinema
  Su Friedrich at Outcast Films
  Scar Tissue at UbuWeb
  From the Ground Up at Microcinema
  From the Ground Up Nassau Weekly review by Martina Car
  From The Ground Up Curledupdvd.com review by Trent Daniel
  Seeing Red The New York Times review by Stuart Klawans
  Sink or Swim Chicago Reader review by Fred Camper
  The Films of Su Friedrich (Outcast Films) Senses of Cinema review by William C. Wees
 Media Arts Fellowship

1954 births
Living people
American cinematographers
American documentary filmmakers
American experimental filmmakers
American film editors
American women cinematographers
American lesbian artists
LGBT film directors
LGBT producers
American women film editors
American women documentary filmmakers
Women experimental filmmakers
Artists from New Haven, Connecticut
Film directors from Connecticut
Film producers from Connecticut
Oberlin College alumni
Princeton University faculty
Heresies Collective members
American women academics
21st-century American women artists